Katamso Darmokusumo (5 February 1923 – 1 October 1965) was the commander of Military District (Korem) 072 in the Diponegoro Area Military command of the Indonesian Army in Central Java. He was kidnapped and killed by members of the 30 September Movement.

References

Indonesian generals
National Heroes of Indonesia
1965 deaths
1923 births